A giant animal in mythology is unusually large, either for their species or in relation to humans. The term giant carries some ambiguity, however in mythology definitions of what constitutes 'large' vary, with definitions ranging from 40 kg to 250 kg. At the upper, they may be further subdivided into small (250–500 kg), medium (500–1,000 kg) and large (over 1,000 kg). Megafauna often form one of the mythemes of a story. The narrative may revolve around a real animal or a primordial archetype of a gigantic creature, such as a dragon or the Midgard snake.

Examples of megafauna

Africa megafauna mythology 
Dingonek
Nandi bear
Kongamoto
Mokele-mbembe
Grootslang
Salawa
Werehyena

Oceania megafauna mythology 
Abaia
Bunyip
Gazeka
Yowie
Tiddalik
Rainbow Serpent

Central and South America megafauna mythology 
Headless Mule
Mapinguari
Peuchen
Yacumama

North America megafauna mythology 
Amarok
Altamaha-ha
Akhlut
Bigfoot
Jersey devil
Mothman
Mugwump
Ogopogo
Thunderbird
Tizheruk
Snallygaster
Wechuge
Wendigo
Hidebehind
Hodag
Hugag
Underwater panther

Eurasian megafauna mythology 
Akkorokamui
Bake-kujira
Baku
Bakunawa
Basan
Behemoth
Dragon
Fenghuang
Chinese dragons
Chimera
Each Uisge
Japanese dragons
Gashadokuro
Genbu
Griffin
Cerberus
Hellhound
Hibagon
Hippocampus
Hydra
Manticore
Mongolian death worm
Nāga
Nue
Karkadann
Kelpie
Kraken
Leviathan
Loch Ness Monster
Midgard snake
Ushi-Oni
Pegasus
Qilin
Shisa
Sphinx
Roc
Unicorn
Timingila
Yeti
Ziz

References

Mythological archetypes